Corporal Patrick Attipoe (died 28 February 1948) was a Ghanaian ex-serviceman and veteran of World War II. He was one of the three veterans shot dead by Major Imray while on their way to present a petition to Sir Gerald Creasy who was Governor of Gold Coast at the time. The death of these three ex-servicemen led to the 1948 Accra Riots.

References 

1948 deaths
Year of birth missing